The 2015 McGrath Cup  is a Gaelic football competition played by the teams of Munster GAA. The competition differs from the Munster Senior Football Championship as it also features further education colleges and the winning team does not progress to another tournament at All-Ireland level. 
On 24 January, Waterford won their second McGrath Cup after a nine-point win over UCC at Fraher Field in Dungarvan. 
In front of a crowd of 907, Joey Veale, Maurice O’Gorman and Gavin Nugent got the three goals in a 3-12 to 1-9 victory.

Teams
The following Third Level Colleges took part in 2015
 University College Cork (UCC)
 Tralee IT
 University of Limerick (UL)
 Cork Institute of Technology (CIT)
 Mary Immaculate College (Mary I)

The following counties took part in 2015
Cork
Kerry
Tipperary
Limerick
Waterford

Match Results

Preliminary round
4 January
Waterford 1-16 UL 2-7 at WIT 	
Cork 7-20 Mary I 0-4 at Mallow

Quarter-finals
11 January
Kerry 0-16 Tralee IT 4-12	
Limerick 3-9 UCC 4-16	
Tipperary 0-12 Cork 1-14	
Waterford 1-11 CIT 0-9

Semi-finals
16 January
UCC 0-18 Tralee IT 0-6	
18 January
Waterford 0-8 Cork 0-7

Final
24 January
Waterford 3-12 UCC 1-9 at Fraher Field Dungarvan.

References

External links
McGrath Cup at Munster GAA

McGrath Cup
McGrath Cup